This list of exurbs in the United States from the Finding Exurbia report was identified by the Brookings Institution in 2006.

Criteria
To qualify as an exurb in the Finding Exurbia report, a census tract must meet three criteria:
 Economic connection to a large metropolis. 
 Low housing density: bottom third of census tracts with regard to housing density.
 Population growth exceeding the average for its metropolitan area.

List
These exurbs are listed in the report.

Bibb County, AL
Blount County, AL
Chilton County, AL
Shelby County, AL
St. Clair County, AL
Pinal County, AZ
Faulkner County, AR
Grant County, AR
Hot Spring County, AR
Lonoke County, AR
Perry County, AR
Calaveras County, CA
Clear Creek County, CO
Elbert County, CO
Gilpin County, CO
Park County, CO
Teller County, CO
Hernando County, FL
Lake County, FL
Osceola County, FL
Barrow County, GA
Bartow County, GA
Butts County, GA
Coweta County, GA
Dawson County, GA
Jackson County, GA
Jasper County, GA
Lumpkin County, GA
Newton County, GA
Pickens County, GA
Walton County, GA
Mills County, IA
DeKalb County, IL
Grundy County, IL
Monroe County, IL
Dearborn County, IN
Franklin County, IN
Jasper County, IN
Newton County, IN
LaPorte County, IN
Porter County, IN
Butler County, KS
Kingman County, KS
Miami County, KS
Bracken County, KY
Gallatin County, KY
Grant County, KY
Pendleton County, KY
East Feliciana Parish, LA
Livingston Parish, LA
Plaquemines Parish, LA
St. Tammany Parish, LA
West Baton Rouge Parish, LA
West Feliciana Parish, LA
Calvert County, MD
Carroll County, MD
Cecil County, MD
Charles County, MD
Frederick County, MD
St. Mary's County, MD
Queen Anne's County, MD
Pine County, MN
Scott County, MN
Sherburne County, MN
Wright County, MN
Franklin County, MO
Jefferson County, MO
Lincoln County, MO
Montgomery County, MO
Ste. Genevieve County, MO
Warren County, MO
Washington County, MO
Anson County, NC
Currituck County, NC
Franklin County, NC
Gates County, NC
Iredell County, NC
Johnston County, NC
Cass County, NE
Washington County, NE
Strafford County, NH
Sussex County, NJ
Warren County, NJ
Torrance County, NM
Valencia County, NM
Nye County, NV
Dutchess County, NY
Orange County, NY
Orleans County, NY
Brown County, OH
Clinton County, OH
Geauga County, OH
Madison County, OH
Medina County, OH
Morrow County, OH
Perry County, OH
Pickaway County, OH
Union County, OH
Bryan County, OK
Creek County, OK
Grady County, OK
Lincoln County, OK
Logan County, OK
McClain County, OK
Okmulgee County, OK
Osage County, OK
Pawnee County, OK
Rogers County, OK
Wagoner County, OK
Yamhill County, OR
Monroe County, PA
Pike County, PA
Wayne County, PA
Washington County, RI
Berkeley County, SC
Calhoun County, SC
Fairfield County, SC
Kershaw County, SC
Lexington County, SC
Newberry County, SC
Saluda County, SC
York County, SC
Blount County, TN
Cannon County, TN
Cheatham County, TN
Dickson County, TN
Hickman County, TN
Jefferson County, TN
Loudon County, TN
Roane County, TN
Robertson County, TN
Rutherford County, TN
Sevier County, TN
Trousdale County, TN
Union County, TN
Wilson County, TN
Atascosa County, TX
Bandera County, TX
Bastrop County, TX
Blanco County, TX
Burnet County, TX
Caldwell County, TX
Chambers County, TX
Comal County, TX
Ellis County, TX
Guadalupe County, TX
Hays County, TX
Henderson County, TX
Hood County, TX
Hunt County, TX
Johnson County, TX
Kaufman County, TX
Kendall County, TX
Medina County, TX
Parker County, TX
Rains County, TX
Van Zandt County, TX
Waller County, TX
Wilson County, TX
Wise County, TX
Summit County, UT
Tooele County, UT
Amelia County, VA
Caroline County, VA
Charles City County, VA
Culpeper County, VA
Cumberland County, VA
Fauquier County, VA
Frederick County, VA
Gloucester County, VA
Goochland County, VA
Hanover County, VA
Isle of Wight County, VA
King George County, VA
King William County, VA
Louisa County, VA
Middlesex County, VA
New Kent County, VA
Orange County, VA
Powhatan County, VA
Spotsylvania County, VA
Stafford County, VA
Suffolk, VA
Surry County, VA
Sussex County, VA
Warren County, VA
Island County, WA
Berkeley County, WV
Kenosha County, WI
Polk County, WI
St. Croix County, WI
Jefferson County, WV

References

Urban studies and planning terminology
Urbanization